Online is the second English-language international studio album by the Latvian rock band Brainstorm was released on September 10, 2001 on the Microphone Records. The album was also produced by Tony Mansfield, a former member of New Musik and the record was also made in the United Kingdom. The album was also released in the Latvian version as Kaķēns, kurš atteicās no jūrasskolas" in the same year. The singles including "Online", "Maybe" and Waterfall, earned the attention, but not only in Latvia and also in Eastern Europe, Central Europe and Poland when the album was give the certification status as gold. It also sold over between 35,000 copies and later surpassed over 80,000 copies.

"Online" was also named as the "Latvian Pop Music Album of the Year" by the Annual Latvian Music Recording Awards.

Track listing

Personnel 
 Renārs Kaupers - vocals, guitar
 Jānis Jubalts - guitar
 Kaspars Roga - drums
 Gundars Maudevics - bass
 Maris Mihelsons - keyboards

Release history

Singles

References 

2001 albums
Brainstorm (Latvian band) albums